The Akilattirattu Ammanai and Arul Nool are the scriptures of Ayyavazhi. While Akilathirattu Ammnai is the primary holy text, Arul Nool is considered the secondary regarding the religious importance. The Akilam is further scheduled into seventeen sections and the Arul Nool into eleven.

Akilattirattu Ammanai

Akilam one
Akilam two
Akilam three
Akilam four
Akilam five
Akilam fifteen
Akilam seventeen
Akilam sixteen
Akilam six
Akilam seven
Akilam eight
Akilam nine
Akilam ten
Akilam eleven
Akilam twelve
Akilam thirteen
Akilam fourteen
Akilam fifteen
Akilam sixteen
Akilam seventeen

Arul Nool

Ukappadippu
Pothippu
Ucchippadippu
Saattu Neettolai
Nadutheervai Ula
Panchadevar Urppatthi
Patthiram
Sivakanta Athikarappatthiram
Thingal patham
Saptha Kannimar Padal
Kalyana Vazhthu

See also

 Ayyavazhi holy sites
 Hari Gopalan Citar
 Citar

Ayyavazhi

Tamil Hindu literature